Elliott Kastner (January 7, 1930 – June 30, 2010) was an American film producer, whose best known credits include Where Eagles Dare (1968), The Long Goodbye (1973), The Missouri Breaks (1976), and Angel Heart (1987).

Early life and education
Kastner was born to a Jewish family in New York City. His father died when he was young and he was raised by his mother in Harlem.

He attended the University of Miami and Columbia University. During the 1950s he was stationed with U.S. Eucom (United States European Command), in Frankfurt, Germany and Paris, France.

Career
Kastner worked in the mail room at the William Morris Agency in New York, becoming a literary agent.

He moved to Los Angeles and became a talent agent at the Music Corporation of America (MCA). When that agency merged with Decca Records, which owned Universal Pictures, Lew Wasserman, the president of MCA, made Kastner vice president of production at Universal. He worked there for two years before becoming an independent producer.

Producer
Kastner's first film as producer was Bus Riley's Back in Town (1965) based on a script by William Inge and starring Ann-Margret and Michael Parks. Inge was so unhappy with the final result he requested his name be taken off the credits and the film was not a commercial or critical success.

Jerry Gershwin
Kastner then teamed up with producer Jerry Gershwin to form Winkast Film Productions, based at Pinewood Studios in Buckinghamshire. They wound up making eleven movies together, the first of which was the highly popular Harper (1966) from a novel by Ross Macdonald and directed by Jack Smight. The screenplay was written by William Goldman who had been talking to Kastner about a film of Goldman's novel Boys and Girls Together; Goldman suggested that the Ross MacDonald Lew Archer series would make a good movie, and Kastner bought the rights. Kastner then got Goldman to write a sequel The Chill, but it was never made.

Kastner's third film was Kaleidescope (1966), made in England, directed by Smight with Warren Beatty and Susannah York. Kastner and Gershwin raised the finance independently, and sold it to a studio, Warner Bros. "That was the beginning of producers taking control creatively by self financing", said his stepson Cassian Elwes, who later became a producer himself.

Winkast then made The Bobo (1968), starring Peter Sellers and his then-wife Britt Ekland, and Sweet November (1968), with Sandy Dennis. Both were released through Warners, but Sol Madrid (1968) was released through MGM.

Sol Madrid was directed by Brian G. Hutton who helmed Kastner and Gershwin's next film, Where Eagles Dare (1968). The producer had managed to persuade Alistair MacLean to write an original screenplay as a vehicle for Richard Burton (it was later turned into a novel). The movie was a big hit and led to Kastner adapting several other MacLean stories and working with Burton a number of other times.

Less popular was The Night of the Following Day (1969) with Marlon Brando.

Burton was meant to star in Laughter in the Dark (1969) but was fired during filming and replaced by Nicol Williamson.

Other MacLean adaptations included When Eight Bells Toll (1971), Fear is the Key and Breakheart Pass (1975). He would also reteam with Burton on several occasions – as well as working with Burton's wife,  Elizabeth Taylor.

Kastner also partnered up with noted producers Alan Ladd, Jr. and Jay Kanter and together they produced the films Villain (1971), The Nightcomers (1972), Zee and Co. (1972) and Fear Is the Key (1972).

Kastner is also famous for his film adaptations of three Raymond Chandler's novels based on the exploits of one of Chandler's most famous creations, Philip Marlowe: The Long Goodbye (1973), Farewell, My Lovely (1975) and The Big Sleep (1978) the latter two both starring Robert Mitchum as Marlowe.

In 1976 Kastner produced The Missouri Breaks starring Marlon Brando and Jack Nicholson. Kastner famously got each star to commit by lying and telling them the other one had already signed.

In a 1977 article Mario Puzo wrote about the Cannes Film Festival said that a group of producers regarded Kastner as "the greatest genius in the movie business... [he] has put together very big films, nearly all of which are flops. And yet he can get the money and stars to produce any movie he decides to. He does it with a phone, irresistible charm, and shameless chutzpah."

Alan Parker, who made Angel Heart with the producer, called him " an irascible gadfly in the film industry, having been involved with more films than Technicolor and outlived fifty studio heads and as many lawsuits. Many was the time I’ve seen him ‘work’ the tables in the Pinewood Studios restaurant on the way to the men's room. He usually stayed just long enough to blow his nose in your napkin, dispense some wickedly cynical aphorism about the movies and move on. There is an oft-told story that Marlon Brando finally said yes to doing Missouri Breaks because he could not face the prospect of Elliott Kastner, on his knees, crying in front of him one more time."

Colleague Jay Kanter said Kastner's reputation in Hollywood was  "Some good, some bad. He was relentless in pursuing what he wanted. I mean dogged in his pursuit." He added "If Elliott believed in some material, he'd never hesitate to put his own money into buying it and hiring writers to develop a screenplay. He was passionate about what he did, and he was a terrific salesman as well."

His obituary in the Guardian stated that "Kastner was relentless in his pursuit of getting what he wanted. Mostly he wanted to entice well-known playwrights and novelists to write screenplays, or gain the rights of those works whose authors were no longer around to cajole."

Later years
In the mid-1980s Kastner frequently worked with his step son, Cassian Elwes. In the 1970s he had mentored Arnon Milchan.

In 1987 Kastner and Andre Blay bought 70% of Cinema Group Home video. In 1988 he declared bankruptcy.

In the late 1990s he bought Roger Corman's Concorde New Horizons for $100 million.

Kastner's career was marked by a number of lawsuits, including with Mickey Rourke and David McClintick, and over the film Frank and Jesse.

Family
He was married and divorced twice. In 1960 he first married actor Carolyn Hughes. He was the second husband of the interior designer Tessa Kennedy (m 1971), with whom he had two children, a son, Dillon and a daughter, Milica. He had been introduced to Kennedy by Warren Beatty.

"The marriage worked very well", says Kennedy. "For eight years we'd only spend three or four days a month together. It wouldn't have lasted more than a year if we'd been together because we're very different and volatile." Kennedy and Kastner separated in 1995.

He was also a stepfather to Kennedy's three sons from a previous marriage: film producer Cassian Elwes, artist Damian Elwes and actor Cary Elwes.

Death
Elliott Kastner died of cancer on June 30, 2010, in London at the age of 80.

Towards the end of his life he had approached David Thomson to see if he was interested in writing Kastner's biography. Thomson recalled: He was the way producers were once supposed to be—showily cynical yet deeply attached to his projects; absolutely aware that a producer had to make a lot of pictures before the trash and the triumphs got sorted out; belligerent but sensitive, tough-mouthed sometimes; arrogant and Cagneyesque, but very well read; devoted to writers and alert to children... He admitted he had been a scoundrel sometimes—you had to be—but he knew there was good work to show for it.

According to one obituary he: "Was noted for his skill in bringing together writers, directors and stars for generally commercial (though sometimes surprisingly cerebral) films. He excelled in literary adaptations, from popular works such as those of Raymond Chandler and Alistair MacLean to the more esoteric output of such writers as Iris Murdoch, Vladimir Nabokov and Edna O'Brien. He also favoured tales with strong, single-minded heroes and produced films featuring such actors as Marlon Brando, Paul Newman, Jack Nicholson, Robert Mitchum, Burt Reynolds and Richard Burton."

In 2014 it was announced a deal had been struck to release all of his films on DVD.

Filmography
He was a producer in all films unless otherwise noted.

Film

Miscellaneous crew

Thanks

Unmade films
The Children of Sanchez (1962)
Flight into Camden from novel by David Storey (1962)
Hanno's Doll with Jane Fonda and Stanley Kramer (1962)
adaptation of Boys and Girls Together (1966) – to be directed by Sydney Pollack
The Telephone Book an original script by Harry Cohn (1966)
Sard Harker based on a book by John Masefield
Fruit of the Poppy by Robert Wilder
Chow Charlie Babybased on novel by David Dodge
The Violent Land a western to be directed by Brian Hutton
Revolutionary Road based on novel by Richard Yates
musical adaptation of Treasure Island for Cinema Center Films (1968)
The Chill (1967) – sequel to Harper – at one stage to be directed by Sam Peckinpah
Rose of Tibet (late 1960s)
Hall of Mirrors (late 1960s)
Caribbean (late 1960s)
The Violent Land (late 1960s)
Hive of Glass (late 1960s)
Sard Harder (late 1960s)
Confidence Man (late 1960s)
 adaptation of Gore Vidal's Julian with script by Vidal (1968)
adaptation of The Forty Days of Musa Daugh (1969)
The Pictures of Fidelman (1971) based on novel by Bernard Malmud
Sleep is for the Rich based on novel by Donald MacKenzie (1972)
The Boy Who Invented the Bubble Gun (1973)
Untitled Tony Bennett/Ruby Braff-George Barnes Quartet Documentary aka This Funny World (working title) (1973)
Gunfighters (1977)
Serpentine based on life of Charles Sobhraj (1977)
adaptation of The Deer Park by Norman Mailer (1988)
adaptation of book Indecent Exposure (1987)|*Jericho with Marlon Brando (1987)
The Madman's Tale based on novel by John Kaztenbach (2004)

Television

Theatre credits
Two Weeks Somewhere Else by Herman Raucher (1966)
Marilyn! The Musical (1983)

References

External links

Obituary at The Hollywood Reporter
Obituary at Variety
Obituary at Los Angeles Times
Elliot Kastner credits at BFI
Cinema VII 
Oldies.com
Channel 4
Vanity Fair
Turner Classic Movies

1930 births
2010 deaths
20th-century American Jews
American expatriates in England
Film producers from New York (state)
Deaths from cancer in England
Columbia University alumni
Film producers from London
People from New York City
University of Miami alumni
21st-century American Jews